Daniel Dreisbach is an American author, academic, and attorney. He is currently a professor at the American University School of Public Affairs.

Dreisbach teaches at the Summer Institute program of the James Madison Memorial Fellowship Foundation.

He is a specialist on the constitutional issue of the separation of church and state.

See also
 Americans United for Separation of Church and State#Reception by religious community

References

Year of birth missing (living people)
Living people
American lawyers
American male writers
American University faculty and staff
Religious scholars